This article lists the full results for knockout stage of 2020 European Men's Team Badminton Championships. All times are Central European Time (UTC+01:00).

Quarterfinals

Denmark vs. Germany

Russia vs. Bulgaria

Ukraine vs. France

Netherlands vs. England

Semifinals

Denmark vs. Russia

France vs. Netherlands

Final

Denmark vs. Netherlands

References

2020 European Men's and Women's Team Badminton Championships